Wychnor (or Wichnor) is a village and civil parish in Staffordshire, England. It is situated in the East Staffordshire local government district, adjoining Alrewas and Barton-under-Needwood. It is situated on the formerly Roman road  Ryknild Street, current known as the A38, and contains the hamlet of Wychnor Bridges where the A38 crosses the River Trent. The Trent and Mersey Canal passes through the parish. There is a railway junction nearby; Wychnor Junction where the South Staffordshire Line joins the Cross Country Route.

Its earliest spelling was Hwiccenofre. 'Ofre' was the Anglo-Saxon word for "edge or bank". Hwicce was a province comprising Gloucestershire, Worcestershire and a part of Warwickshire, its people being called Hwiccas or Hwicii. It is thought that some of these people came to settle in Wychnor and so gave their name to the place they settled in. In the Doomsday Book, it is referred to as "Wicenore".

The parish also contains Wychnor Park, an 18th-century country house, formerly owned by the Levett Family.  In the 2001 census the parish had a population of 70.

See also
Listed buildings in Wychnor

References

 

Villages in Staffordshire
Civil parishes in Staffordshire
Borough of East Staffordshire